is a Japanese manga series written and illustrated by Aya Kanno. Loosely based on the Shakespearean plays Henry VI, Part 3 and Richard III, the series follows an intersex version of Richard III during the tumultuous Wars of the Roses (1455–1487) period in English history. The manga was serialized in Akita Shoten's Monthly Princess magazine from October 2013 to January 2022, with its chapters collected into 16 bound volumes as of December 2021. It is licensed in English by Viz Media. It has inspired three drama CDs, two spin-off manga series, an original novel, a stage play, and an anime television series adaptation by J.C.Staff, which aired from January to June 2022.

Plot
As the Kingdom of England is torn between the House of York and the House of Lancaster—each claiming their leader to be the rightful king—young Richard III, the intersex son of the Duke of York, is fighting a battle within himself. Despised by his mother, adored by his father, and alienated from most others, Richard grapples with frightful spirits haunting him, unsteady and unintentional alliances with his enemies, and his own passion for a throne.

Characters
Richard III

Third son of Richard Duke of York, younger brother of Edward IV and George, and eventually the third and final Yorkist king of England. Richard is raging a battle inside. He feels alienated because he is intersex.
Henry VI

Head of the Lancaster family and King of England.
Queen Margaret

Wife of Henry VI and Queen of England. 
Prince Edward of Lancaster

Son of Henry VI and Margaret and Prince of Wales.
Catesby

Richard III's servant.
Warwick

Known as the "Kingmaker", a powerful supporter of first the York family and then the Lancaster family.
Richard Plantagenet, Duke of York

First leader of the York family, husband of Cecily, father of Edward IV, George, Duke of Clarence, and Richard III.
Cecily Neville, Duchess of York

Wife of Richard Plantagenet, mother of Edward IV, George, Duke of Clarence, and Richard III. Despises her son Richard as a monster for being intersex.
Edward IV of York

Oldest son of Richard Duke of York, older brother of Richard and George, second leader of the York family, and first Yorkist king of England.
George, Duke of Clarence

Second son of Richard Duke of York, younger brother of Edward IV and older brother of Richard.
Joan of Arc

A French warrior woman who fought for her people in the Hundred Year's War. Believed by the English to be a witch. Appears in visions to Richard III to torment him.
Anne Neville

Youngest daughter of Warwick. Married first to Prince Edward of Lancaster and then to Richard III.
Isabelle Neville

Oldest daughter of Warwick. Wife of George and Duchess of Clarence.
Queen Elizabeth

Wife of Edward IV and later Queen of England. Secretly seeks revenge on Edward for the death of her first husband Sir John Grey.
Edward V
Oldest son of Edward IV and Queen Elizabeth and briefly the second Yorkist king of England.
Richard, Duke of York
Second son of Edward IV and Queen Elizabeth.
Beth
Daughter of Edward IV and Queen Elizabeth.
Richard Grey
Son of Queen of Elizabeth and Sir John Grey. Half-brother to Edward V, Richard, Duke of York and Beth.
Earl Rivers

Brother of Queen Elizabeth.
Buckingham

Ally to Richard III.
Jane Shore

Witch and mistress to first Edward IV and then Lord Hastings.
Lord Hastings
Ally first to Richard III and then to the Woodville family.
James Tyrell

The murderer of the Princes in the Tower.
Albany
Brother of King James III of Scotland and would-be king of Scotland. Ally to Richard III.
Thomas Stanley
Earl of Derby and ally of Queen Elizabeth.
Margaret Pole
Daughter of George, Duke of Clarence and Isabelle Neville.
Edward Plantagenet
Son of George, Duke of Clarence and Isabelle Neville.
Edward of Middleham
Alleged son of Richard III and Anne Neville.
Richmond

Nephew of Henry VI and stepson of Thomas Stanley. Richard III's final rival for control of the throne of England.

Media

Manga
Requiem of the Rose King was written and illustrated by Aya Kanno. It was serialized in Akita Shoten's  (girls') manga magazine Monthly Princess, starting in the magazine's November 2013 issue on 4 October 2013. On 4 June 2021, Kanno announced that she had completed the storyboard for the final Requiem of the Rose King chapter. On 6 October 2021, Monthly Princess revealed that the series would end in four chapters. Requiem of the Rose King concluded in the magazine's February 2022 issue on 6 January 2022. Akita Shoten collects the series' individual chapters into  (bound volumes) published under their Princess Comics imprint; the 17th and final volume will be released in Japan on 16 June 2022.

Internationally, the series is licensed for an English-language release in North America by Viz Media under the company's Shojo Beat imprint. It is also licensed in French by Éditions Ki-oon, in German by Carlsen Comics, in Polish by Waneko, in Spanish by Ediciones Tomodomo, in Italian by Edizioni Star Comics, and in Chinese by Tong Li Publishing.

Volume list

Spin-offs

King of Idol
A spin-off manga series, King of Idol: , began serialization in the February 2021 issue of Monthly Princess on 6 January 2021. It portrays the Requiem of the Rose King characters as high school students training to become "idols" or entertainers.

Bara-Ō no Sōretsu: Gaiden
A second spin-off manga series, began serialization in the April 2022 issue of Monthly Princess on 4 March 2022. The series is written and illustrated by Kanno, and its chapters will be collected into two  volumes. The series focuses on events not covered in the main series, including stories about the characters' everyday lives and Queen Margaret's past.

Drama CDs
Requiem of the Rose King has inspired three drama CDs produced by Akita Shoten in Japan. The first, based on volume three of the manga, was bundled with the February 2016 issue of Monthly Princess, released on 6 January 2016. The second, based on volumes four and five of the manga, was included with a limited edition of volume seven, released on 16 January 2017. The third, based on volumes five and six of the manga, was bundled with the March 2017 issue of Monthly Princess, released on 6 February 2017. All three drama CDs starred Mitsuki Saiga as Richard III and Daisuke Namikawa as Henry VI.

Anime
On 16 September 2020, Akita Shoten announced via their YouTube channel that Requiem of the Rose King would be adapted into an anime television series. The series is animated by J.C.Staff and directed by Kentarō Suzuki, with Hiroki Uchida writing and supervising the scripts, Tsutomu Hashizume designing the characters, and Kow Otani composing the musical score. The series was originally scheduled to premiere in October 2021, but was delayed due to production issues. It aired from 9 January to 26 June 2022, on Tokyo MX and other channels in Japan. The series aired for two consecutive cours, for a half-year continuous run. The first opening theme is "" ("I'm Obsessed with Roses") performed by Makoto Furukawa, while the first ending theme is "" ("Nightmare") performed by Zaq. The second opening theme is "" ("Rose Briar Rondo") performed by Makoto Furukawa, while the second ending theme is "" performed by Nowlu. Funimation licensed the series as part of their Winter 2022 simulcast lineup in the United States, Canada, United Kingdom, Ireland, Mexico, Brazil, Chile, Colombia, Peru, Australia, and New Zealand. Medialink licensed the series in Southeast Asia, South Asia, and Oceania minus Australia and New Zealand.

Episode list

Stage play
A stage play adaptation of the manga is scheduled to run at the Nippon Seinenkan hall in Tokyo from June 10 to June 19, 2022. The play will be directed by Fumiya Matsuzaki, with its script written by Requiem of the Rose King anime screenplay writer Hiroki Uchida. It will star both a female actor, Yumi Wakatsuki, and a male actor, Sayato Arima, as the intersex Richard III. Additional cast members include Takuma Wada as Henry VI; Yūki Kimisawa as Edward IV of York; Gaku Takamoto as George, Duke of Clarence; Shō Katō as Catesby; Yūsuke Seto as Warwick; Ryōta Hirono as Prince Edward of Lancaster; Sena as Anne Neville; Sayaka Fujioka as Cecily Neville, Duchess of York; Ryōko Tanaka as Queen Margaret; and Masashi Taniguchi as Richard Plantagenet, Duke of York.

Other media
A bonus manga chapter, was published in the July 2015 issue of Monthly Princess on 5 June 2015. The chapter depicts Kanno's trip to England with her editor for the reburial of King Richard III in March of that year.

An art book, was published by Akita Shoten on 15 June 2018.

A spin-off novel, was published by Akita Shoten on 15 December 2021. The novel was written by Yō Makusu, with cover art by Kanno.

A fanbook was published by Akita Shoten on 16 March 2022, collecting character information, tribute illustrations, and manga previously omitted from the bound volume release of the main series.

Reception
In the 2015 edition of Takarajimasha's  guidebook, Requiem of the Rose King tied with Tanaka-kun is Always Listless for number 17 on the list of the top 20 manga for female readers. Japanese actor Kenji Urai, who portrayed Henry VI in a production of the Shakespearean play at the New National Theatre Tokyo, stated that he is a "big fan" of the manga. Moto Hagio, a pioneering  manga artist, praised Requiem of the Rose Kings depiction of "a whole new Richard III", calling it "more interesting than Shakespeare!"

Notes

References

Further reading

External links
  
  
  
 

2022 anime television series debuts
Akita Shoten manga
Androgyny in fiction
Anime series based on manga
Aya Kanno
Comics based on works by William Shakespeare
Comics set in the 15th century
Dark fantasy anime and manga
Drama anime and manga
Funimation
Historical anime and manga
Intersex in fiction
J.C.Staff
Japanese LGBT-related animated television series
LGBT in anime and manga
LGBT-related adaptations of works by William Shakespeare
Medialink
Romance anime and manga
Shōjo manga
Transgender in anime and manga
Viz Media manga
Works based on Richard III (play)